The 2009 Volta de Ciclismo Internacional do Estado de São Paulo (Portuguese for International Cycling Tour of the State of São Paulo) is the 6th edition of a multi-day road cycling stage race held in the state of São Paulo. This edition features 9 stages over 1289 km, disputed from August 22 to 30, 2009. The race is a 2.2 event in the 2008–2009 UCI America Tour. In this edition, the race has been nicknamed Tour of Brazil.

Classification and bonuses 
In this edition of the race, time bonuses of 10, 6 and 4 seconds are awarded to the top 3 riders in each stage. Time bonuses of 3, 2 and 1 seconds are awarded to the first 3 riders at each intermediary sprint point. For the points classification, the top 5 riders in each stage are awarded 10, 7, 5, 3 and 2 points, respectively. The first 3 riders at each intermediary sprint receive 5, 3 and 2 points. Climbs are classified among 4 categories. The first 3 riders at each summit are awarded points in the mountains classification according to the category:

 Category 2: 9, 7, 6 pts
 Category 3: 7, 5, 4 pts
 Category 4: 5, 3, 2 pts

The team classification accounts the times of the first 3 riders of each team in each stage.

Stages and Results

Stage 1: São Paulo 

Held Saturday, August 22, 2009, on the Ponte Estaiada, in São Paulo. This prologue stage was a team time trial, for a total distance of 6.0 km. The stage was won by team Scott–Marcondes Cesar–São José dos Campos with a time of 7'44.831". Teams Padaria Real-Sorocaba and FAPI-Pindamonhangaba took second and third place, with times of 7'56.404" and 7'58.427", respectively. Curiously, bicycles aren't allowed in the Ponte Estaiada

Stage 2: São Paulo to São José dos Campos 

Held Sunday, August 23, 2009. This stage was 91.1 km long. A field of 122 riders finished with the same time of the stage winner, Hector Figueiras.

Stage 3: São José dos Campos to Atibaia 

Held Monday, August 24, 2009. This stage was 103.0 km long.

Stage 4: Atibaia to São Carlos 

Held Tuesday, August 25, 2009. This stage was 239 km long.

Stage 5: São Carlos to Ribeirão Preto 

Held Wednesday, August 26, 2009. This stage was 95.8 km long.

References 

        
    * Stage 1 Results
 Stage 2 Results
 Stage 3 Results
 Stage 4 Results
 Stage 5 Results
 Stage 6 Results
 Stage 7 Results
 Stage 8 Results
 Stage 9 Results

Volta de Ciclismo Internacional do Estado de São Paulo
Volta de Ciclismo Internacional
Volta de Ciclismo Internacional do Estado de São Paulo
August 2009 sports events in South America